Malik Clements (born October 4, 1996) is a professional Canadian football linebacker for the Winnipeg Blue Bombers of the Canadian Football League (CFL).

College career
Clements played college football for the Cincinnati Bearcats from 2015 to 2018. He played in 34 games where he had 187 total tackles, nine for loss, two sacks, two forced fumbles, one fumble recovery, and one interception.

Professional career

Edmonton Elks
Clements signed with the Edmonton Elks on January 24, 2020, but did not play that year due to the cancellation of the 2020 CFL season. He made the team following training camp in 2021 and played in his first career professional game on August 7, 2021, against the Ottawa Redblacks. He played in seven regular season games where he had 11 defensive tackles and two special teams tackles. Following a head coaching change by the team, Clements was released in the following offseason on February 17, 2022.

Winnipeg Blue Bombers
On March 4, 2022, it was announced that Clements had signed with the Winnipeg Blue Bombers. He began the year as a backup, but became the team's starting weak-side linebacker following an injury to Kyrie Wilson. He played in 12 regular season games in 2022 where he had 31 defensive tackles, four special teams tackles, and one sack.

References

External links
 Winnipeg Blue Bombers bio

1996 births
Living people
American football linebackers
American players of Canadian football
Canadian football linebackers
Cincinnati Bearcats football players
Edmonton Elks players
Sportspeople from Danville, Virginia
Players of American football from Virginia
Winnipeg Blue Bombers players